Benjamin Turner Sankey (September 2, 1907 – October 14, 2001) was a Major League Baseball shortstop who played for the Pittsburgh Pirates over parts of three seasons from  to .Sankey played professional baseball until 1941 and retired at the age of 33. During his 13 year professional career he played across 6 leagues on 9 teams. Although his MLB career was short lived, he gained popularity during his tenure with the Montreal Royals. During his 6 seasons in Montreal he learned French and became very popular among the people of Montreal. He was inducted in the International League Hall of Fame in 1947 as part of the inaugural class.

External links
 

1907 births
2001 deaths
Major League Baseball shortstops
Pittsburgh Pirates players
Baseball players from Alabama
People from Walker County, Alabama